Sérgio Dutra Júnior (born 25 April 1988), known as Júnior Dutra, is a Brazilian professional footballer who is currently a free agent. Mainly plays as a winger, he can also play as an attacking midfielder or a forward.

Club career
Born in Santos, São Paulo, Júnior Dutra joined Santos FC's youth setup in 1998 at the age of ten. Released in 2003, he had a three-year spell at Atlético Paranaense before joining Santo André.

Júnior Dutra made his senior debut on 30 May 2008, coming on as a second-half substitute in a 0–0 Campeonato Paulista Série A2 away draw against Oeste; it was also the tournament's final. His professional debut occurred on 8 August, starting in a 3–2 home win against Ceará for the Série B championship.

Júnior Dutra contributed with seven appearances, as his side achieved promotion to Série A after finishing second. He scored his first professional goal on 1 February 2009, netting the first in a 2–0 away win against São Paulo.

Júnior Dutra made his top flight debut on 4 June 2009, starting in a 3–3 home draw against former side Santos. He scored his first goal in the category on 19 August, netting the first in a 2–1 success at Botafogo.

After scoring two goals in 24 league matches, Júnior Dutra moved abroad and joined J1 League side Kyoto Sanga FC, for a fee of R$8 million. An undisputed starter, he suffered relegation with the club during his first season.

In 2012 Júnior Dutra signed for Kashima Antlers, again being an ever-present figure and scoring a career-best eight goals during the campaign, also being crowned champions of the year's J.League Cup. On 10 January 2013 he moved to Europe, after agreeing to an 18-month contract with Lokeren in the Belgian Pro League.

In February 2015 Júnior Dutra switched teams and countries again, after signing for Qatar Stars League side Al-Arabi. On 28 February he scored a hat-trick in a 4–4 away draw against Al Kharaitiyat, and roughly a month later he scored the league's fastest goal by netting in the tenth second in a 1–3 loss at Lekhwiya.

In March 2016 Júnior Dutra rescinded with Al-Arabi, after having unpaid wages. He subsequently represented Vasco da Gama and Avaí back in his homeland.

He joined Corinthians in 2018.

On 5 November 2021, Dutra joined Lee Man. He left the club on 30 June 2022 after he finished his contract with the club.

Club statistics

Honours
Lokeren
Belgian Cup: 2013–14

Corinthians
Campeonato Paulista: 2018

Avaí
Campeonato Catarinense: 2021

References

External links

1988 births
Living people
Sportspeople from Santos, São Paulo
Brazilian footballers
Association football wingers
Association football forwards
Association football utility players
Campeonato Brasileiro Série A players
Campeonato Brasileiro Série B players
Esporte Clube Santo André players
CR Vasco da Gama players
Avaí FC players
Sport Club Corinthians Paulista players
J1 League players
J2 League players
Qatar Stars League players
UAE Pro League players
Kyoto Sanga FC players
Kashima Antlers players
Shimizu S-Pulse players
Belgian Pro League players
Hong Kong Premier League players
K.S.C. Lokeren Oost-Vlaanderen players
Al-Arabi SC (Qatar) players
Al-Nasr SC (Dubai) players
Lee Man FC players
Brazilian expatriate footballers
Brazilian expatriate sportspeople in Japan
Brazilian expatriate sportspeople in Belgium
Brazilian expatriate sportspeople in Qatar
Brazilian expatriate sportspeople in Hong Kong
Brazilian expatriate sportspeople in the United Arab Emirates
Expatriate footballers in the United Arab Emirates
Expatriate footballers in Japan
Expatriate footballers in Belgium
Expatriate footballers in Qatar
Expatriate footballers in Hong Kong